Hylan may refer to:

 John F. Hylan, notable Democrat and Mayor of New York City from 1918 to 1925
 hyaluronan (also known as hyaluronic acid or hyaluronate)